Ourimbah Creek, a perennial river of the Central Coast catchment, is located in the Central Coast region of New South Wales, Australia.

Course and features
The river descends  over its  course.

Etymology
The name of the town Ourimbah, near which the river passes, is derived from the Australian Aboriginal word meaning bora or ceremonial ground; or the word for "the sacred circle on the initiation site for investing the Oorin or belt of manhood".

See also 

 List of rivers of Australia
 List of rivers of New South Wales (L-Z)
 Rivers of New South Wales

References

External links
 

Rivers of New South Wales
Central Coast (New South Wales)
Central Coast Council (New South Wales)